Angus McLean may refer to:

Angus Wilton McLean (1870–1935), American banker, governor of North Carolina
Angus McLean (footballer) (1925–1979), Welsh football player and manager
Angus Alexander McLean (1854–1943), Canadian lawyer and politician, MP for Queen's, 1904–1908 and 1911–1917
Angus MacLean (1914–2000), Canadian politician and farmer, MP for Queen's, 1951–1968 and Malpeque, 1968–1976
 Angus MacLean (British Columbia politician) (1891–1972)